Kids in Philly is the second studio album by the band Marah, released in 2000. The songs draw from musical influences including Bruce Springsteen, Mummer string bands, Phil Spector and roots rock, while the album's lyrics are rooted in the band's Philadelphia home. Kids in Philly garnered widespread critical praise for its energetic abandon, lyrical sincerity and depth, and unabashed pilfering of numerous musical influences.

Reviews of subsequent Marah albums would make comparisons with Kids in Philly so often that Dave Bielanko would lament it as "my old albatross" on 2010's Life is a Problem.

Track listing
"Faraway You" – 3:30
"Point Breeze" – 2:14
"Christian Street" – 3:21
"It's Only Money, Tyrone" – 3:26
"My Heart Is The Bums On The Street" – 2:19
"The Catfisherman" – 3:55
"Round-Eye Blues" – 4:11
"From The Skyline of a Great Big Town" – 3:31
"Barstool Boys" – 2:57
"The History of Where Someone Has Been Killed" – 4:05
"This Town" – 3:38

Personnel
Dave Bielanko: Organ, Najo, Guitar, Piano, Chimes, Xylophone
Serge Bielanko: Banjo, Guitar, Harmonica, Percussion, Xylophone
Jeff Clarke: Bagpipes
Michael Hood: Trombone
Bruce Langfeld: Organ, Acoustic Guitar, Mandolin, Piano
Danny Metz: Banjo, Bass
Paul Smith: Organ, Guitar, Percussion, Electric Piano, Mixing
Ronnie Vance: Percussion, Drums

References

 

2000 albums
Marah (band) albums
Artemis Records albums